The Beautiful Struggle is the second studio album by American rapper Talib Kweli. The album was released on September 28, 2004, by Rawkus Records and Geffen Records. The album features guest appearances such as Common, Faith Evans, Anthony Hamilton, Mary J. Blige and John Legend.

The album featured production from Kanye West, The Neptunes, Supa Dave West, Just Blaze and Hi-Tek. The first single off the album, "I Try" featuring Mary J. Blige, was fairly popular as a music video, followed by the second single "Never Been In Love".

Track listing
Credits adapted from the album's liner notes.

Sample Credits
 "Around My Way" contains replayed elements of "Every Little Thing She Does Is Magic" by The Police.

Personnel
Credits adapted from the album's liner notes.

 Mark Batson – piano , keyboards  
 Steve Baughman – mixing 
 Elizabeth "Yummy" Bingham – additional vocals 
 Mary J. Blige – featured artist 
 Tom Brick – mastering
 David Brown – engineer 
 Charlemagne – producer 
 Andrew Coleman – engineer 
 Common – featured artist 
 Dave Dar – engineer , mixing , co-executive producer
 Dion – additional vocals 
 Faith Evans – featured artist , additional vocals 
 Brian Garten – engineer 
 Anthony Hamilton – featured artist 
 Hi-Tek – producer and engineer 
 Chad Hugo – producer 
 Jun Ishizeki – assistant engineer 
 Glen Jeffries – guitar 
 Just Blaze – producer 
 Gimel "Young Guru" Keaton – mixing 
 J.R. – producer , additional keyboards 
 Krondon – additional vocals 
 Talib Kweli – main artist, executive producer
 John Legend – featured artist 
 Alan Mason – vocal engineer for Mary J. Blige 
 Midi Mafia – producers 
 Tiffany Mynon – additional vocals 
 Jamia Simone Nash – additional vocals 
 Olivia Charnae Nash – additional vocals 
 Axel Niehaus – mixing 
 Bob Power – mixing 
 Res – featured artist , additional vocals 
 Justin Shturtz – assistant engineer 
 Corey Smyth – executive producer
 Spacey T – guitar 
 Phil Tan – mixing 
 Alex Thomas – additional vocals 
 Antwan "Amadeus" Thompson – producer 
 Tone Mason – producer 
 Kanye West – producer 
 Supa Dave West – producer 
 Pharrell Williams – producer and additional vocals 
 Dave Young – additional vocals 
 Anthony Zeller – assistant engineer , mixing assistant

Chart positions

References

External links
 

Talib Kweli albums
2004 albums
Rawkus Records albums
Albums produced by Kanye West
Albums produced by Just Blaze
Albums produced by Midi Mafia
Albums produced by the Neptunes
Albums produced by J. R. Rotem
Albums produced by Hi-Tek
Albums produced by Tone Mason
Geffen Records albums